Charles Keyes may refer to:
Charles Patton Keyes (1822–1896), British Indian Army officer
Charles Henry Keyes (1858–1925), American educator
Charles R. Keyes (1871–1951), Iowa archaeologist
Charles Rollin Keyes (1864–1942), American geologist
Charles F. Keyes (1937-2022), American anthropologist